Lee Barrett may refer to:

Lee Barrett, founder of Candlelight Records
Lee Barrett, character in The Satan Bug
Lee and Oli Barrett, YouTubers in China

See also